Sam Rivers / Dave Holland Vol. 2 is an album by American jazz saxophonist Sam Rivers and English double-bassist Dave Holland featuring performances recorded in 1976 and released on the Improvising Artists label.

Reception 
The Allmusic review by Scott Yanow awarded the album 3 stars, stating, "When Sam Rivers met up with bassist Dave Holland for a set of duets, he decided to record two LPs and play a different instrument on each of the sidelong pieces... Since tenor is easily Rivers's strongest ax, this set (which has now been reissued on CD) is of somewhat limited interest yet is generally successful. The flute piece has several different sections that keep both the musicians and listeners interested, while Rivers's piano feature is quite intense; he leaves few notes unplayed".

Track listing
All compositions by Sam Rivers
 "Ripples" - 23:49 
 "Deluge" - 23:23
Recorded at Big Apple Studio in New York City on February 18, 1976

Personnel
Sam Rivers - flute (track 1), piano (track 2)
Dave Holland - bass

References

External links
Dave Holland's profile on Allaboutjazz.com

Improvising Artists Records albums
Sam Rivers (jazz musician) albums
Dave Holland albums
1976 albums